McKee Creek is a creek located in the Atlin Country region of British Columbia. The creek flows into Atlin Lake from the east side. It is located 8 miles south of Atlin Town and is 7 miles in length. McKee Creek was first discovered in 1898, and since then has been hand-mined and hydraulicked. Outfits such as Atlin Mining Company have worked the creek, with the largest gold nugget recovered from the creek weighing just over 28 ounces. McKee Creek was a consistent mining producer well into the 1930s.

References

External links
 

Rivers of British Columbia
Cassiar Land District